Martín Merquelanz Castellanos (born 12 June 1995) is a Spanish professional footballer who plays as a left winger for Real Sociedad.

Club career
Born in Irun, Gipuzkoa, Basque Country (Spain), Merquelanz joined Real Sociedad's youth setup in 2012, from Antiguoko. He was promoted to the reserves on 23 June 2014, and made his senior debut on 31 August by coming on as a second-half substitute for Pablo Hervías in a 0–3 Segunda División B away loss against CD Tudelano.

Merquelanz scored his first senior goal on 20 September 2015, netting the second in a 5–0 away routing of CD Mensajero. Roughly one year later, he scored a hat-trick in a 4–0 home thrashing of Gernika Club, and finished the 2016–17 campaign with ten goals in 36 matches.

Merquelanz renewed his contract until 2019 on 17 May 2017, but suffered a serious knee injury in December, which kept him out for the remainder of the campaign. The following 12 January, he extended his contract until 2020.

On 14 August 2018, Merquelanz was definitely promoted to the main squad in La Liga. He made his debut in the category on 31 August, replacing Asier Illarramendi in a 1–2 away loss against SD Eibar, but being taken off three minutes later due to an injury.

On 19 July 2019, after spending the campaign nursing his knee injury, Merquelanz joined Segunda División side CD Mirandés on loan for one year. He scored his first professional goal on 24 August, netting the equalizer in a 1–2 home loss against Cádiz CF. Merquelanz was a regular starter for the Castilian-Leonese side, scoring a career-best 15 goals and helping the club avoid relegation and reach the semi-finals of the Copa del Rey.

Upon returning to Real Sociedad, Merquelanz agreed to a contract extension with the club until 2025 on 8 August 2020. Roughly one year later, after featuring sparingly, he was loaned to fellow top tier side Rayo Vallecano for the season.

Career statistics

Club

References

External links

1995 births
Living people
Sportspeople from Irun
Spanish footballers
Footballers from the Basque Country (autonomous community)
Association football wingers
La Liga players
Segunda División players
Segunda División B players
Real Sociedad B footballers
Real Sociedad footballers
CD Mirandés footballers
Rayo Vallecano players